TKB-022PM No. 1 (ТКБ-022ПМ № 1), TKB-022PM No. 2 (ТКБ-022ПМ № 2) and TKB-022PM5 No. 1 (ТКБ-022ПМ5 № 1)  were Soviet bullpup assault rifles, capable of fully automatic fire, chambered for the 7.62×39mm round (TKB-022PM No. 1 and TKB-022PM No. 2) and the .220 Russian round (TKB-022PM5 No. 1), developed by the small arms designer German A. Korobov in the 1960s.

The weapons were gas-operated with an annular gas piston located around the barrel and a vertically moving bolt, which made it possible to minimize the length of the receiver group. A U-shaped rammer/extractor was used to chamber and extract the cartridge by pushing it into the chamber where after discharge was pulled back from the chamber and again, upon feeding the new cartridge, pushed forward and slightly up into an ejection tube above the barrel where finally exiting above the muzzle. Due to this ejection mechanism, it was possible to fire from both right and left arm positions.

These weapons had the best barrel length to overall length ratio among the assault rifles. Firing from an unstable position, the TKB-022PM No. 1 and the TKB-022PM No. 2 had three times better accuracy than the AKM. The TKB-022PM5 No. 1 had better accuracy than the AKM when fired from a hand in a lying position at a distance of 100 meters.

Although these assault rifles performed well, they were turned down by the Soviet army for being too radical at that time. Additionally, there were concerns about the displaced center of gravity to the tail end of the weapon and the durability of the weapon's plastic housing during prolonged operations under difficult conditions or during storage.

See also
List of Russian Weaponry
List of bullpup firearms
List of assault rifles
TKB-011 2M
TKB-0146

References

 http://weapon.at.ua/load/321-1-0-825

5.6×39mm firearms
7.62×39mm assault rifles
Assault rifles of the Soviet Union
Bullpup rifles
Trial and research firearms of the Soviet Union